John Blunt may refer to:

John Henry Blunt (1823–1884), English divine
John James Blunt (1794–1855), English divine
John W. Blunt (1840–1910), American Union soldier, Medal of Honor recipient
Sir John Blunt, 1st Baronet (1665–1733), of the Blunt baronets
Sir John Harvey Blunt, 8th Baronet (1839–1922), of the Blunt baronets
Sir John Harvey Blunt, 9th Baronet (1872–1938), of the Blunt baronets
Sir John Lionel Reginald Blunt, 10th Baronet (1908–1969), of the Blunt baronets
John Blunt, singer, Freddie Mercury impersonator

See also
John Blount (disambiguation) (often pronounced Blunt)